"Cool Places" is a 1983 new wave song recorded by American pop band Sparks in collaboration with the Go-Go's rhythm guitarist and backing vocalist Jane Wiedlin. It was their second single to enter the Billboard Hot 100.

Background
The song was released as the lead single from Sparks's twelfth studio album In Outer Space (1983). At the time, Sparks were at their most popular in the US, their two previous studio albums having dented the lower reaches of the Billboard 200 album chart. The single peaked at No. 13 on the Hot Dance Club Play charts in June 1983. The song's success followed the success of their previous single and only other Hot 100 entry "I Predict".

A music video for the song was directed by California born filmmaker and artist Graeme Whifler.

Sparks recorded "Lucky Me, Lucky You" with Jane Wiedlin for the same parent album.

Track listing
7" Atlantic 0-89863
"Cool Places" — 3:25
"Sports" — 3:23

12" Atlantic 0-89863
"Cool Places" (Long Mix) — 4:38
"Sports" — 3:23

Chart performance

Other versions
The song was part of the Go-Go's set when they toured in the 2010's, with Belinda Carlisle singing the Russell Mael vocals opposite Wiedlin.

References

External links
Official music video
Official audio only video on Wiedlin's YouTube channel
 

1983 songs
1983 singles
Male–female vocal duets
Sparks (band) songs
Jane Wiedlin songs
Songs written by Ron Mael
Songs written by Russell Mael
Atlantic Records singles